The Reward of Patience is a 1916 American drama silent film directed by Robert G. Vignola and written by Shannon Fife. The film stars Louise Huff, John Bowers, Lottie Pickford, Kate Lester, Adolphe Menjou and Gertrude Norman. The film was released on September 10, 1916, by Paramount Pictures.

Plot

Cast   
Louise Huff as Patience
John Bowers as Robert Penfield
Lottie Pickford as Edith Penfield
Kate Lester as Mrs. Penfield
Adolphe Menjou as Paul Dunstan
Gertrude Norman as Mother Osborn

References

External links 
 

1916 films
1910s English-language films
Silent American drama films
1916 drama films
Paramount Pictures films
Films directed by Robert G. Vignola
American black-and-white films
American silent feature films
1910s American films

https://en.wikipedia.org/w/index.php?title=Wikipedia:STB&redirect=no